The Andrew Carr Sr. House on 4th Ave., NW, in Minot, North Dakota  was designed by  William Zimmerman  in Classical Revival architecture.  It was listed on the National Register of Historic Places in 1984.  The listing included two contributing buildings.

According to its NRHP nomination, one reason the house is historically significant is that it is "one of a few well-preserved examples of massive architect-designed homes built by affluent North Dakotans at the turn of the century."

The house was built as a residence for Dr. Andrew Carr Sr. (1854–1948) and Addie McIntyre Carr (1862-1940). The Carr family home started to be built in 1903 and was finished and moved into in 1906. The former residence is now the site of the  Dakotah Rose Bed and Breakfast.

References

External links
Dakotah Rose Bed and Breakfast website

Houses on the National Register of Historic Places in North Dakota
Neoclassical architecture in North Dakota
Houses completed in 1903
Buildings and structures in Minot, North Dakota
Houses in Ward County, North Dakota
National Register of Historic Places in Ward County, North Dakota
1903 establishments in North Dakota